Abe no Kooji (安倍子祖父) was a Japanese courtier and waka poet of the Nara period.

Biography 
The birth and death dates of the courtier and poet known as Abe no Kooji are unknown. His kabane was Ason. He was an imperial attendant (大舎人 ōtoneri) in the service of Prince Toneri. 's Man'yōshū Kogi (万葉集古義) speculates that he was the same person as Hiketa no Kooji (引田朝臣子祖父 Hiketa no Ason Kooji).

Poetry 
Poems 3838 and 3839 in the Man'yōshū are attributed to him. He presented the poems to Prince Toneri, for which he received a payment of 2,000 mon.

References

Works cited 

 
 
 

8th-century Japanese poets
Man'yō poets
Japanese male poets